Friday Bridge is a village in Elm  civil parish, part of the Fenland district of Cambridgeshire, England. It is 3 miles south of Wisbech.

History

In 1838 a Wesleyan  Methodist congregation was established and a chapel in 1843.

The ecclesiastical parish was formed in 1860 from the civil parish of Elm. St Mark's Church of England parish church, designed by J. B. Owen opened in 1865.
The church is now Grade II listed. A church day school was opened in 1871. 
The Wisbech Water Works Co Ltd Water Tower was completed in 1894.
The Friday Bridge county secondary modern school was opened in 1928.

The clock tower in the village is the war memorial. Friday Bridge was the site  of a  World War II prisoner of war camp which was converted to a hostel for migrant workers in the late 1940s.

The village was struck by a weak F0/T0 tornado on 23 November 1981, as part of the record-breaking nationwide tornado outbreak on that day.

References 

Villages in Cambridgeshire
1860 establishments in England
Fenland District